Putzeys is a Belgian surname. Notable people with the surname include:

 Armand Putzeys (1916–2003), Belgian cyclist
 Bruno Putzeys (born 1973), Belgian audio engineer
 Jules Putzeys (1809–1882), Belgian magistrate and entomologist

Surnames of Belgian origin